The 2016 China Championship (officially the 2016 Evergrande China Championship) was a professional non-ranking snooker tournament that took place between 1–5 November 2016 in Guangzhou, China.

It was the first staging of the tournament, and the plans were for it to become a full ranking event for the following three years, with the biggest prize pool for any event ever held outside the UK previously.

John Higgins became the inaugural winner by beating Stuart Bingham 10–7 in the final.

Prize fund
The breakdown of prize money from this year is shown below:

 Winner: £200,000
 Runner-up: £100,000
 Semi-final: £50,000
 Quarter-final: £30,000
 Last 16: £15,000
 Highest break: £10,000
 Total: £650,000

The "rolling 147 prize" for a maximum break stands at £TBD.

Seeding list

The top 10 snooker players on the ranking list after the Shanghai Masters, along with the top 4 players on the one year prize money ranking list were invited to participate in the event. The remaining two players (Marco Fu and Liang Wenbo) were selected by the Chinese Billiards and Snooker Association. Mark Williams became eligible to participate after the withdrawal of world number 10 Ronnie O'Sullivan from the competition, as he was next in line to qualify through his official world ranking.

Source:

Main draw

Final

Century breaks

 144, 129, 121, 101  Shaun Murphy
 141, 122, 118, 114, 112, 104, 102  Stuart Bingham
 140, 131, 114, 106, 100  Mark Allen
 134, 131, 123, 101, 100  John Higgins
 127  Mark Selby

References

2016
2016 in snooker
2016 in Chinese sport
Snooker non-ranking competitions
China Championship